Cochylimorpha blandana is a species of moth of the family Tortricidae. It is found in Ukraine, Russia and the Near East.

The wingspan is 16–17 mm. Adults have been recorded on wing in July.

References

Moths described in 1844
Cochylimorpha
Moths of Europe
Moths of Asia